Kathryn Johnston may refer to:

Kathryn Johnston (1914–2006), victim in a 2006 police shooting in Atlanta
Kathryn Johnston Massar, baseball player
Catharine Johnston (1794–1871), English botanical illustrator

See also  
Katharine Johnson (disambiguation)